The year 1894 in science and technology involved some significant events, listed below.

Astronomy
 March 21 (23:00 GMT) – Syzygy: Mercury transits the Sun as seen from Venus, and Mercury and Venus both simultaneously transit the Sun as seen from Saturn.

Biology
 Patrick Manson develops the thesis that malaria is spread by mosquitoes.
 Jean Pierre Mégnin publishes La faune des cadavres application de l'entomologie à la médecine légale in Paris, an important text in forensic entomology.

Chemistry
 Argon identified by Lord Rayleigh and Sir William Ramsay.
 Viscose, a form of artificial silk or rayon, is patented by Charles Frederick Cross with Edward John Bevan and Clayton Beadle.

Physiology and medicine
 Otto Binswanger describes what will become known as Binswanger's disease.

Psychology
 Psychological Review established in the United States by James Mark Baldwin and James McKeen Cattell.

Technology
 August 13 – The first Allan truss bridge, designed by Percy Allan, is completed in New South Wales.
 August 14 – Oliver Lodge demonstrates "Hertzian waves" i.e. radio transmission (of Morse code) in the University of Oxford from the Clarendon Laboratory to the University Museum (200 ft/60 m) for the British Association for the Advancement of Science using a modified Branly coherer.
 November 6 – William C. Hooker of Abingdon, Illinois is granted a United States patent for a spring-loaded mousetrap.
 Construction of the first oil-engined rail locomotive, an experimental unit designed by William Dent Priestman and built by his company, Priestman Brothers of Hull, England.
 John Joly of Dublin devises the Joly colour screen, an additive colour photographic process for producing images from a single photographic plate.
 Astronomical photographer Julius Scheiner devises a film speed measurement system.

Awards
 Copley Medal: Edward Frankland
 Wollaston Medal for Geology: Karl von Zittel

Births

 January 1 – S. N. Bose (died 1974), Indian physicist.
 January 13 – Dorothée Pullinger (died 1986), French-born British production engineer.
 February 11 – Izaak Kolthoff (died 1993), Dutch 'father of analytical chemistry'.
 February 16 – Constance Tipper, née Elam (died 1995), English metallurgist.
 April 29 – Marietta Blau (died 1970), Austrian physicist.
 May 5 – August Dvorak (died 1975), American educational psychologist.
 June 13 – Leo Kanner (died 1981), Austrian-born clinical child psychiatrist.
 June 14 – W. W. E. Ross (died 1966), Canadian geophysicist and poet.
 June 23 – Alfred Kinsey (died 1956), American biologist, professor of entomology and zoology, and sexologist, founder of the Institute for Sex Research at Indiana University (Bloomington) in 1947.
 July 8 – Pyotr Kapitsa (died 1984), Russian physicist, Nobel Prize laureate.
 July 17 – Georges Lemaître (died 1966), Belgian physicist.
 August 2 – Bertha Lutz (died 1976), Brazilian herpetologist and women's rights campaigner.
 November 19 – Heinz Hopf (died 1971), German mathematician.

Deaths

 January 1 – Heinrich Hertz (born 1857), German physicist.
 February 3 – Edmond Frémy (born 1814), French chemist.
 March 29 – Georges Pouchet (born 1833), French comparative anatomist.
 April 2 – Charles-Édouard Brown-Séquard (born 1817), Mauritian-born physiologist and neurologist.
 April 9 – Arthur Hill Hassall (born 1817), English physician, microbiologist and chemical analyst.
 April 27 – Birdsill Holly (born 1820), American hydraulic engineer.
 November 26 – Pafnuty Chebyshev (born 1821), Russian mathematician.
 October 7 – Oliver Wendell Holmes, Sr. (born 1809), American physician and writer.
 September 8 – Hermann von Helmholtz (born 1821), German physicist.

References

 
19th century in science
1890s in science